New Mills Central railway station serves the town of New Mills in Derbyshire, England. The town is also served by New Mills Newtown station, which is on the Buxton to Stockport and Manchester line.

History

In the mid-19th century, the Manchester, Buxton, Matlock and Midlands Junction Railway ran as far as Rowsley and was extended by the Midland Railway to Buxton, in its aim to run as far as Manchester. The Manchester, Sheffield & Lincolnshire Railway also wished to extend southwards from its main line through Woodhead Tunnel to Sheffield and had built a branch to Hyde. Meanwhile, the London and North Western Railway had constructed their own line to Buxton from Whaley Bridge, with a station at Newtown, which effectively blocked the other two.

An agreement was reached whereby the MS&LR would build their proposed "Marple, New Mills and Hayfield Junction Railway", while the Midland Railway would extend its line to New Mills from Millers Dale via Chinley. Passenger services began to Hayfield in 1868 and the line came under joint control as the Sheffield and Midland Railway Companies' Committee in 1870, while the Midland's line opened in 1867.

Although the Hayfield branch is now closed, as is the tunnel (though a stub of the old branch line through the tunnel was used for some years afterwards as a turnback siding for trains terminating here), users can still travel most of its route on foot, bicycle or horse, along what is now known as the Sett Valley Trail.

Station

The station lies at the junction of what was the Hayfield branch and the Midland line; the two appearing through tunnels on a ledge blasted out of the cliff face, some forty feet above the River Goyt.

The buildings on the down side still exist, as does the stationmaster's house built in 1864. The London line from Millers Dale closed in 1967 and the Hayfield branch closed in January 1970, but the station still supports the Hope Valley Line local service from Sheffield to Manchester. Stopping trains from Sheffield formerly terminated here and those passengers wishing to travel onwards to Manchester had to change trains (most express services from Sheffield to Manchester ran through without stopping). This practice ceased, however, when through trains were diverted via Hazel Grove and Stockport in 1986.

The station does, however, remain a terminus for hourly services from Manchester — these can now return directly from the eastbound platform following signalling alterations in 2007, which also saw the remaining semaphore signals at the station replaced by colour lights. A siding remains at the Marple end of the station to enable empty stock to be stabled clear of the main line.

The booking office is on platform 1. Train information is offered via automated announcements, digital display screens and timetable posters. No level access is available: access to the booking office and platform 1 is via a steep lane from the main road, while platform 2 is accessed by means of a path and flight of steps.

Services
There is now a half-hourly service to Manchester Piccadilly northbound on weekdays and an hourly stopping service to Sheffield. An hourly service operates in both directions on a Sunday.

Notes

References

External links

RAILSCOT - New Mills Central

Railway stations in Derbyshire
DfT Category E stations
Former Great Central and Midland Joint Railway stations
Railway stations in Great Britain opened in 1865
Northern franchise railway stations
New Mills